The 1999 Ondo State gubernatorial election occurred in Nigeria on 9 January 1999. The AD nominee Adebayo Adefarati won the election defeating the PDP candidate.

Adebayo Adefarati emerged AD candidate.

Electoral system
The Governor of Ondo State is elected using the plurality voting system.

Primary election

AD primary
The AD primary election was won by Adebayo Adefarati.

Results
The total number of registered voters in the state was 1,333,617. Total number of votes cast was 557,148, while number of valid votes was 544,299. Rejected votes were 12,849.

References 

Ondo State gubernatorial elections
Ondo State gubernatorial election
Ondo State gubernatorial election
Ondo State gubernatorial election